Cassutto is a surname. Notable people with the surname include:

 Ernest Cassutto (1919–1985), Dutch Holocaust survivor
 Elisabeth Cassutto (1931–1984), wife of Ernest Cassutto

See also
Cassuto